Lynn Morris (1954–2017) was a Christian fiction author.  She was the daughter of Gilbert Morris and co-wrote with him on most of her books.

Books by Lynn Morris

Cheney Duvall, M.D. Series 

This series was co-written with her father, Gilbert Morris

Published by Bethany House: "A trailblazing woman of courage, Cheney Duvall graduates from the first American college to grant degrees to women physicians just as the Civil War ends. Long-standing prejudices have not dissipated, however, and she must prove herself time and again--testing her dedication and the faith that compels her."

 The Stars for a Light, 1994
 Shadow of the Mountains, 1994
 A City Not Forsaken, 1995
 Toward the Sunrising, 1996
 Secret Place of Thunder, 1996
 In The Twilight, In The Evening, 1997
 Island of the Innocent, 1998
 Driven With the Wind, 2000

Omega Trilogy 

Published by Thomas Nelson. Co-written with her father, Gilbert Morris and brother,  Alan Morris.

 The Beginning Of Sorrows, 1999
 Fallen Stars, Bitter Waters, 2000 
 Seven Golden Vials, never released

Cheney and Shiloh: The Inheritance Series 

This is a follow up series to Cheney Duvall, M.D.  Also co-written with her father, Gilbert Morris.

Published by Bethany House: "Cheney Duvall is now married to Shiloh, but that doesn't mean life will get any easier. Shiloh's past continues to come back to haunt them, and the couple finds themselves swept up in adventure and excitement as they use their medical skills to help the needy."

 Where Two Seas Met, 2001 
 The Moon By Night, 2004
 There is a Season, 2005

The Creole Series 

Published by Thomas Nelson.  Co-written with Gilbert Morris.
 
 The Exiles, 2003 (also called The Exiles: Chantel)
 The Immortelles, 2004 (also called The Immortelles: Damita)
 The Alchemy, 2004 (also called The Alchemy: Simone)
 The Tapestry, 2005 (also called The Tapestry: Leonie)

Standalone books 

 The Balcony, 1997 from the Portraits Series
 Red & Lowering Sky

References

External links
 Fantastic Fiction: Lynn Morris

Christian writers
1954 births
Living people
20th-century American novelists
21st-century American novelists
American women novelists
American historical novelists
20th-century American women writers
21st-century American women writers
Women historical novelists